The seventh World Cup of Softball was held in Oklahoma City, Oklahoma USA between June 27 and July 2, 2012.  The competing national teams were the United States, Puerto Rico, Brazil, Canada, Netherlands and Australia.  Some games were televised on the ESPN family of channels, and they were all broadcast online on ESPN3.

Current standings

Preliminary round
all times CDT

Position Round
all times CDT

References 

World Cup of Softball
2012 in softball